Dried blood spot testing (DBS) is a form of biosampling where blood samples are blotted and dried on filter paper. The dried samples can easily be shipped to an analytical laboratory and analysed using various methods such as DNA amplification or HPLC.

History
Ivar Bang first described the DBS as an unusual sampling method in 1913. The concept that capillary blood, obtained from pricking the heel or finger and blotted onto filter paper, could be used to screen for metabolic diseases in large populations of neonates was introduced in Scotland by Robert Guthrie in 1963. Neonatal screening for phenylketonuria became nationwide in 1969–70. Since then, Guthrie card samples have been collected routinely from infants in over 20 countries to screen for phenylketonuria and more recently for congenital hypothyroidism, sickle cell disorders and HIV infection.  The limitations of sensitivity and specificity when screening such small volumes of blood restricted the use of dried blood spots for many years.  However, recent advances such as the production of monoclonal antibodies, expression of synthetic proteins, and the introduction of the polymerase chain reaction have overcome many of these problems.

This type of blood testing is now available for use at home by consumers in the U.S.  Available blood tests include vitamin D, estrogen, testosterone, cortisol, TSH and lipids.  New York is the only state that prohibits home blood spot testing.

Procedure
Dried blood spot specimens are collected by applying a few drops of blood, drawn by lancet from the finger, heel or toe, onto specially manufactured absorbent filter paper. The blood is allowed to thoroughly saturate the paper and is air dried for several hours.  Specimens are stored in low gas-permeability plastic bags with desiccant added to reduce humidity, and may be kept at ambient temperature, even in tropical climates.

Once in the laboratory, technicians separate a small disc of saturated paper from the sheet using an automated or manual hole punch, dropping the disc into a flat bottomed microtitre plate.  The blood is eluted out in phosphate buffered saline containing 0.05% Tween 80 and 0.005% sodium azide, overnight at 4 °C. The resultant plate containing the eluates forms the "master" from which dilutions can be made for subsequent testing.

As an alternative to punching out a paper disc, recent automation solutions extract the sample by flushing an eluent through the filter without punching it out. An automation including the application of an internal standard prior extraction was developed by the Swiss company CAMAG.

Dried blood spot testing for HIV infection
The technology holds promise for expanding diagnostic services to HIV-infected infants in resource-poor settings due to the samples' longer lifespan with reduced need for refrigeration and the less invasive nature of the test compared with other methods.  Unlike ELISA testing for HIV-antibodies in the blood, which may be transmitted to infants in pregnancy independently of the virus itself, dried blood spot testing can be used to detect genetic material of the actual virus, thereby avoiding the likelihood of a false positive result.
Dried blood spot testing for HIV is not considered sensitive enough for diagnostic testing, but may be useful in estimating prevalence of HIV through surveillance.
DBS specimens also pose less of a biohazard risk to handlers, and are easier to transport or store than liquid blood specimens.

Dried Blood Spot for Biobank 
DBS are attractive to biobank due to their low cost and easy to use collection and storage.  A study revealed that they could easily collect large numbers of dried blood samples by the donors. The potential medical value of such biobanks is great due to their ability to detect protein levels and other blood biomarkers.

Principle
The reason for stability of DNA, RNA or protein could be attributed to the fact that the biological material binds to the matrix of the filter paper and the process of drying excludes water which is an important factor necessary for protease or nuclease to act. Binding of the biological material also binds several inhibitors which may interfere with various nucleic acid amplification methods.

See also
 Polymerase chain reaction
 HPLC

References

Blood tests
Biological specimens